The Empire Award for Best Male Newcomer is an Empire Award presented annually by the British film magazine Empire to honor an actor who has delivered a breakthrough performance while working within the film industry. The Empire Award for Best Male Newcomer is one of two ongoing awards which were first introduced at the 17th Empire Awards ceremony in 2012 (along with Best Female Newcomer) with Tom Hiddleston receiving the award for his role in Thor. Josh O'Connor is the most recent winner in this category for his role in God's Own Country. Winners are voted by the readers of Empire magazine.

Winners and nominees
In the list below, winners are listed first in boldface, followed by the other nominees. The number of the ceremony (1st, 2nd, etc.) appears in parentheses after the awards year, linked to the article (if any) on that ceremony.

2010s

References

External links

Actor
Film awards for male debut actors